Gangodavila North Grama Niladhari Division is a Grama Niladhari Division of the Sri Jayawardanapura Kotte Divisional Secretariat of Colombo District of Western Province, Sri Lanka. It has Grama Niladhari Division Code 526.

Nugegoda, Samudradevi Balika Vidyalaya and St. Joseph's Boys' College, Nugegoda are located within, nearby or associated with Gangodavila North.

Gangodavila North is a surrounded by the Kohuwala, Jambugasmulla, Gangodavila South, Gangodavila South B, Nugegoda and Pagoda East Grama Niladhari Divisions.

Demographics

Ethnicity 

The Gangodavila North Grama Niladhari Division has a Sinhalese majority (87.5%). In comparison, the Sri Jayawardanapura Kotte Divisional Secretariat (which contains the Gangodavila North Grama Niladhari Division) has a Sinhalese majority (84.8%)

Religion 

The Gangodavila North Grama Niladhari Division has a Buddhist majority (80.3%). In comparison, the Sri Jayawardanapura Kotte Divisional Secretariat (which contains the Gangodavila North Grama Niladhari Division) has a Buddhist majority (77.1%)

Gallery

References 

Grama Niladhari Divisions of Kotte Divisional Secretariat